Mykola Fedotovych Biliashivskyi, sometimes Biliashivsky (24 October 1867, Uman – 21 April 1926, Kiev) was a Ukrainian archaeologist, ethnographer, and art historian.

References

1867 births
1926 deaths
People from Uman
People from Umansky Uyezd
Members of the 1st State Duma of the Russian Empire
Members of the Central Council of Ukraine
Ukrainian archaeologists
Ukrainian art historians
Taras Shevchenko National University of Kyiv alumni
Members of the National Academy of Sciences of Ukraine